Kondogbia is a surname. Notable people with the surname include:

Evans Kondogbia (born 1989), Central African footballer
Geoffrey Kondogbia (born 1993), Central African footballer, brother of Evans

Surnames of African origin